The House of Movileşti, also Movilă or Moghilă (Cyrillic: Могила), was a family of boyars in the principality of Moldavia, which became related through marriage with the Muşatin family – the traditional House of Moldavian sovereigns.

According to legend, the family name is connected to the aprod Purice, a low-ranking boyar during the time of Prince Stephen the Great (ruled 1457–1504). Purice is said to have gained Stephen's recognition after kneeling down and helping the diminutive prince mount a fresh horse during battle. After emerging victorious, the ruler awarded him large estates, and told him that his family was to be known not by the rather crude Purice ("flea"), but as Movilă ("hill").

They rose to political prominence during the latter part of the 16th century. Several of the Movileşti were favourable to an alliance with the Polish–Lithuanian Commonwealth, intermarried with the Potocki family, and took refuge to southern Poland after being faced with Ottoman reprisals (no longer present in the competitions for the throne after 1634). They survived as szlachta, being awarded a Polish coat of arms (the Mohyła coat of arms).

Members

Princes
In Moldavia:
Ieremia Movilă
Regina/Raina Mohyła, married Prince Michał Wiśniowiecki h. Korybut
Katarzyna Mohyła, married Prince Samuel Korecki h. Pogoń Litewska
Maria Amalia Mohyła, married Stefan Potocki h. Pilawa
Anna Mohyła, married 1. Maksymilian Przerembski h. Nowina, 2. Jan Sędziwój Czarnkowski h. Nałęcz, 3. Władysław Myszkowski h. Jastrzębiec, 4. Stanisław "Rewera" Potocki h. Pilawa
Simion Movilă
Mihail Movilă
Constantin Movilă
Alexandru Movilă
Miron Barnovschi-Movilă
Moise Movilă
In Wallachia:
Simion Movilă
Gabriel Movilă

Others
Petro Mohyla – Metropolitan of Kiev.
Grigore Ureche – Chronicler and high-ranking boyar (Logofăt, Spătar and Great Vornic) in Moldavia

Family tree

Gallery

See also
Moldavian Magnate Wars
Movilă (surname)

External links

Polish noble families
Romanian boyar families
Moldavian nobility